Palembang–Indralaya Toll Road (shortened to Palindra Toll Road) is a toll road in South Sumatra Province, Indonesia. This toll road is part of Trans-Sumatra Toll Road network.

History
Section I of this toll road (Palembang-Pemulutan) was inaugurated by President Joko Widodo on 12 October 2017.

The Minister of Public Works and Housing, Basuki Hadimuljono, said that the construction of the toll road will be integrated with the development of the Merak-Bakauheni port. The road from the port will be connected with Palembang to the Tanjung Api-Api (TAA) port as part of President Joko Widodo's  Sea Toll Program.

The construction of Palindra Toll Road is dominated by swampy lands with heavy terrain which requires a special construction technique using Vacuum Consolidation Method (VCM).

The toll road was free since its inauguration until the end of 2017.

Sections

Exits

See also

Trans-Sumatra Toll Road

References

External links
Palembang-Indralaya Toll Road Profile

Toll roads in Indonesia
Toll roads in Sumatra
Transport in South Sumatra
Palembang